Josep Samitier Vilalta (2 February 1902 – 4 May 1972), also known as José Samitier, was a Spanish football player, manager and scout who played as a midfielder for FC Barcelona, Real Madrid, OGC Nice, the Catalan XI, and Spain. He later coached Atlético Madrid, Nice and Barcelona and worked as a scout for both Barcelona and Real Madrid.

During his playing career with Barcelona, Samitier scored 187 official goals and was the club's all-time highest goalscorer at the time of his retirement. As of 2020, he is the club's fifth all-time top goalscorer behind Luis Suárez, László Kubala, César, and Lionel Messi. As a player, Samitier pioneered the midfield general role and was nicknamed Surrealista (The Surrealist) and Home Magosta (The Grasshopper Man) due to his style.

As a manager, he led Barcelona to a title in La Liga in 1945, and as a scout he recruited another Barcelona legend, László Kubala. However, Samitier was later accused of acting as a double agent when the club tried to sign Alfredo Di Stéfano, and in the 1960s, he fell out with Helenio Herrera and went to work for Real Madrid. Despite his role in the Di Stéfano affair, twice defecting to Real Madrid, and his friendship with Francisco Franco, Samitier remained a legendary figure of FC Barcelona. When he died in 1972, he was given a state funeral and a street that leads to Camp Nou.

Club career

Early life
Born in Barcelona, Catalonia, Samitier played as a junior for FC Internacional before, at the age of 17, he made his debut for FC Barcelona in 1919. As his signing-on bonus, he received a luminous watch and a three-piece suit. Among his teammates at the club was his childhood friend Sagibarba. During holidays at the Catalan resort of Cadaqués, Samitier and Sagibarba had played football with, among others, Salvador Dalí. He was also friends with the famous Spanish artist Salvador Dali.

FC Barcelona
By 1925 Samitier was the highest-paid player in Spain.  He was a member of the legendary FC Barcelona team, coached by Jack Greenwell, that, apart from Sagibarba, also included Paulino Alcántara, Ricardo Zamora, Félix Sesúmaga and, later, Franz Platko. Between 1919 and 1933 he won twelve Campionat de Catalunya titles, five Copa del Rey and the very first La Liga title.  Among the goals he scored were four in the Copa del Rey finals of 1922, 1925, 1926 and 1928.

Madrid CF
In 1933 an aging Samiter found himself in dispute with the FC Barcelona management and he was dropped from the first team. Real Madrid, then known as Madrid CF, were quick to take advantage of the situation. Samitier was reunited with both his friend Ricardo Zamora and then Francisco Bru. Although his career with the Madrid club was short, he did help them win a title in La Liga 1932–33 and the Copa de España in 1934.

Samitier Tribute  
The tribute match to Samitier was held on 13 May 1934 at Estadio Chamartín in Madrid, between Madrid FC and Espanyol, and Samitier scored both the first and the last goals of an 8-2 win. Other Madrid goalscorers include the likes of Eugenio, Hilario, Luis Regueiro and Lazcano, while José Padrón scored one of Espanyol's consolation goals.

Madrid: Zamora (Cayol 45´); Quesada, Maciá, P. Regueiro (Sauto), Bonet, Gurruchaga, (Valle 45´), Lazcano, L. Regueiro (Olivares 45´) Samitier, Hilario and Eugenio.

Espanyol: Martorell (Eizaguirre 45´); Mas, Pérez, Cifuentes, Solé (Antero 45´), Cristià, Prats, Edelmiro, Iriondo, Padrón and Bosch.

Exile in France
In 1936 Samitier made a brief start to his career as a coach. He succeeded Fred Pentland at Atlético Madrid in the middle of the season, but failed to prevent them from being relegated. However, Samitier's new career and Atlético's relegation were postponed with the start of the Spanish Civil War. He found himself arrested by an anarchist militia, but was eventually released and left for France on a warship. His escape was later used by the Nationalist side in an account printed in Marca. In October 1936 he joined OGC Nice as a player, where he was reunited once again with Ricardo Zamora. He subsequently scored 21 goals in 48 matches for the French team. He eventually retired as a player in 1939 and was briefly coach at OGC Nice in 1942.

Return to Barcelona
Samitier returned to Spain and became manager of CF Barcelona in 1944. In 1945 he guided them to only their second ever La Liga title. Then they beat the Copa del Generalísimo winners Atlético Bilbao to win the Copa de Oro Argentina. Samitier subsequently worked as the clubs chief scout and was instrumental in the recruitment of another CF Barcelona legend Ladislao Kubala.

In the summer of 1950 Kubala arrived in Spain with his own team, Hungaria. The team was made up of fellow refugees fleeing Eastern Europe. They played a series of friendlies against a Madrid Select XI, a Spain XI and RCD Español. During these games, Kubala was spotted by both Real Madrid and Samitier. Kubala was offered a contract by Real but was then persuaded by Samitier to sign for CF Barcelona. It has been suggested that Samitier used his connections within Francoist Spain to help arrange the transfer. In the midst of the Cold War, Kubala's escape to the West was used by Francoist Spain and was made into a film The Stars Search for Peace which saw Kubala and Samitier playing themselves.

International career
In 1920, together with Ricardo Zamora, Félix Sesúmaga, Pichichi and José María Belauste, Samitier was a member of the first ever Spanish national squad. The squad, coached by Francisco Bru, won the silver medal at the 1920 Olympic Games. He subsequently made 21 appearances and scored 2 goals for Spain.

Samitier also played 26 games and scored at least 20 goals for the Catalan XI. However, records from the era do not always include accurate statistics and he may have played and scored more. Together with Paulino Alcántara, Sagibarba and Zamora, he helped the Catalan XI win the Prince of Asturias Cup twice in the 1920s, winning the inter-regional competition in 1923–24 and 1926. In the 1924 final, he scored twice in a 4–4 draw against Castile/Madrid XI and scored again in the replay as the Catalan team won 3–2. Catalonia faced Czechoslovakia twice in 1925 and 1926, and Samitier managed to score in both games, a 2–1 win and a 2–1 defeat, respecteviely. His last game for the Catalan XI was his own testimonial on 19 January 1936 at the Les Corts. He scored in a 1–1 draw with SK Sidenice of Czechoslovakia.

Career statistics

Club

International
Scores and results list Spain's goal tally first, score column indicates score after each Samitier goal.

Honours

Player

Club
FC Barcelona
La Liga: 1929
Copa del Rey (5): 1920, 1922, 1925, 1926, 1928
Catalan Championship (12): 1918–19, 1919–20, 1920–21, 1921–22, 1923–24, 1924–25, 1925–26, 1926–27, 1927–28, 1929–30, 1930–31, 1931–32

Madrid CF
La Liga: 1932–33
Copa del Rey: 1934

International
Spain
Olympic Games Silver medal: 1920

Catalan XI

Prince of Asturias Cup: 1923-24 and 1926

Manager
CF Barcelona
 La Liga: 1944–45
 Copa de Oro Argentina: 1945

Citations

References
 Morbo: The Story of Spanish Football (2003), Phil Ball.

External links
   Samitier at www.fcbarcelona.com
 La Liga player stats
   Spain stats
  La Liga manager stats

1902 births
1972 deaths
Spanish footballers
Spanish football managers
Spain international footballers
La Liga managers
Atlético Madrid managers
FC Barcelona managers
OGC Nice managers
La Liga players
Real Madrid CF players
FC Barcelona players
OGC Nice players
Footballers at the 1920 Summer Olympics
Footballers at the 1924 Summer Olympics
Olympic footballers of Spain
Olympic silver medalists for Spain
Footballers from Barcelona
Olympic medalists in football
Spanish expatriate footballers
Spanish expatriate football managers
Expatriate footballers in France
Expatriate football managers in France
Spanish expatriate sportspeople in France
Medalists at the 1920 Summer Olympics
Association football midfielders
Catalonia international footballers